Shepherdstown is the name of some places in the United States of America:

Shepherdstown, Ohio, in Wheeling Township, Belmont County
Shepherdstown, Pennsylvania
Shepherdstown, West Virginia